Pardington is a surname. Notable people with the surname include:

A. R. Pardington (1862–1915), American engineer
Fiona Pardington (born 1961), New Zealand photographer
Jamie Pardington (born 2000), English footballer

See also
Paddington (disambiguation)